Ukraine competed at the 2019 World Championships in Athletics, which was held in Doha between 27 September and 6 October, in a team of 41 athletes (17 men and 24 women), who participated in 22 (out of 49) events. Four athletes had been included to the final entry lists but did not participate in the events including Anastasiia Bryzgina, Yana Kachur, Ivanna Avramchuk (all were entered for women's and mixed 4×400 relays) and Dmytro Bikulov (mixed 4×400 relay).

Medalists

Results

Men

Track and road events

Field events

Women

Track and road events

Field events

Mixed

References

External links 

 Ukraine athletes at the championships' web-page on IAAF's web-site
 IAAF World Championships Doha 2019 Final Entry Lists by Country and Events as of 22 September 2019

Nations at the 2019 World Athletics Championships
World Championships in Athletics
Ukraine at the World Championships in Athletics